Duke Wu of Jin (died 677 BC), ancestral name Ji (姬), given name Cheng (稱) and also known as Duke Wu of Quwo, was the eighteenth ruler of the state of Jin. He was also the last ruler of the state of Quwo before he gained the title as the duke of Jin.

Reign of Quwo
In 716 BC, Zhuang Bo of Quwo died and his son Cheng ascended the throne of Quwo.

In 710 BC, the eighth year of the reign of Marquis Ai of Jin, Marquis Ai of Jin invades a small state south of Jin called Xingting (陘廷). Xingting then made an alliance with Duke Wu of Quwo. In the spring of 709 BC, they attacked Yi (翼), the capital of Jin. Then, he stayed in Xingting for a while. Then, he ordered his half uncle, Han Wan, to ride a chariot with Liang Hong (梁弘) by his right and chase Marquis Ai of Jin who escaped from Yi. They chased him around the bank of the Fen River (汾水) and at that night, they managed to capture Marquis Ai of Jin. The Jin people asked the son of Marquis Ai of Jin, to become the next ruler of Jin and he became Marquis Xiaozi of Jin. In 709 BC, the first year of the reign of Marquis Xiaozi of Jin, Duke Wu of Quwo ordered Han Wan to kill Marquis Ai of Jin.

According to the Records of the Grand Historian, in 706 BC, the fourth year of the reign of Marquis Xiaozi of Jin, Duke Wu of Quwo killed Marquis Xiaozi of Jin. King Huan of Zhou sent Guo Zhong (虢仲) to attack Duke Wu of Quwo so he went back to Quwo. Meanwhile, King Huan of Zhou put the uncle of Marquis Xiaozi of Jin, into the throne of Jin and he became Marquis Min of Jin.

According to the Zuo Zhuan, Duke Wu of Quwo killed Marquis Xiaozi of Jin on the winter of the seventh year of the reign of Duke Huan of Qi which was 705. The year after, King Huan 
of Zhou sent Guo Zhong (虢仲) to put Marquis Xiaozi of Jin into the throne and he became Marquis Min of Jin. Quwo failed to annex the state of Jin in this event.

In 678 BC, in the 28th year of the reign of Marquis Min of Jin, Duke Wu of Quwo attacked and conquered Jin. Duke Wu of Quwo offered gifts to King Xi of Zhou. In the seventh year of the reign of Duke Zhuang Lu which is 677 BC, King Xi of Zhou appointed Cheng the ruler of Jin and gave him the title of Duke.

Reign as Duke of Jin
Not long after Duke Wu of Jin received the title he invaded the state of Zhouwang (周王國) and killed Guizhu (詭諸), one of their court officials. The official who held the power in the state of Zhouwang, Zhou Gongjifu (周公忌父) escaped to the State of Guo (虢國).

Duke Wu of Jin died two years after he received the title of Duke of Jin.

The Sui dynasty Emperors were from the northwest military aristocracy, and emphasized that their patrilineal ancestry was ethnic Han, claiming descent from the Han official Yang Zhen. and the New Book of Tang traced his patrilineal ancestry to the Zhou dynasty kings via Ji Boqiao 姬伯僑, who was the son of Duke Wu of Jin. Ji Boqiao's family became known as the "sheep tongue family" 羊舌氏.

The Yang of Hongnong 弘農楊氏 were asserted as ancestors by the Sui Emperors like the Longxi Li's were asserted as ancestors of the Tang Emperors. The Li of Zhaojun and the Lu of Fanyang hailed from Shandong and were related to the Liu clan which was also linked to the Yang of Hongnong and other clans of Guanlong. Duke Wu of Jin was claimed as the ancestors of the Hongnong Yang.

The Yang of Hongnong, Jia of Hedong, Xiang of Henei, and Wang of Taiyuan from the Tang dynasty were claimed as ancestors by Song dynasty lineages.

There were Dukedoms for the offspring of the royal families of the Zhou dynasty, Sui dynasty, and Tang dynasty in the Later Jin (Five Dynasties).

References

Year of birth unknown
Monarchs of Jin (Chinese state)
8th-century BC Chinese monarchs
7th-century BC Chinese monarchs
677 BC deaths